Richard Avedon (May 15, 1923 – October 1, 2004) was an American fashion and portrait photographer. He worked for Harper's Bazaar, Vogue and Elle specializing in capturing movement in still pictures of fashion, theater and dance. An obituary published in The New York Times said that "his fashion and portrait photographs helped define America's image of style, beauty and culture for the last half-century".

Early life and education 

Avedon was born in New York City to a Jewish family. His father, Jacob Israel Avedon, was a Russian-born immigrant who advanced from menial work to starting his own successful retail dress business on Fifth Avenue called Avedon's Fifth Avenue. His mother, Anna, from a family that owned a dress-manufacturing business, encouraged Richard's love of fashion and art. Avedon's interest in photography emerged when, at age 12, he joined a Young Men's Hebrew Association (YMHA) Camera Club. He would use his family's Kodak Box Brownie not only to feed his curiosity about the world but also to retreat from his personal life. His father was a critical and remote disciplinarian, who insisted that physical strength, education, and money prepared one for life. 

The photographer's first muse was his younger sister, Louise. During her teen years, she struggled through psychiatric treatment, eventually becoming increasingly withdrawn from reality and diagnosed with schizophrenia. These early influences of fashion and family would shape Avedon's life and career, often expressed in his desire to capture tragic beauty in photos.

Avedon attended DeWitt Clinton High School in Bedford Park, Bronx, where from 1937 until 1940 he worked on the school paper, The Magpie, with James Baldwin. As a teen, he also won a Scholastic Art and Writing Award. After graduating from DeWitt Clinton that year, he enrolled at Columbia University to study philosophy and poetry but dropped out after one year. He then started as a photographer for the Merchant Marines, taking ID shots of the crewmen with the Rolleiflex camera his father had given him. From 1944 to 1950, Avedon studied photography with Alexey Brodovitch at his Design Laboratory at The New School for Social Research.

Photography career 

In 1944, Avedon began working as an advertising photographer for a department store, but was quickly endorsed by Alexey Brodovitch, who was art director for the fashion magazine Harper's Bazaar. Lillian Bassman also promoted Avedon's career at Harper's. In 1945, his photographs began appearing in Junior Bazaar and, a year later, in Harper's Bazaar.

In 1946, Avedon had set up his own studio and began providing images for magazines including Vogue and Life. He became the chief photographer for Harper's Bazaar. From 1950, he also contributed photographs to Look and Graphis. In 1952, he became staff editor/photographer for Theatre Arts Magazine. However, towards the end of the 1950s, he became dissatisfied with daylight photography and open air locations and so turned to studio photography, using strobe lighting.

When Diana Vreeland left Harper's Bazaar for Vogue  in 1962, Avedon joined her as a staff photographer. He proceeded to become the lead photographer at Vogue and photographed most of the covers from 1973 until Anna Wintour became editor in chief in late 1988. 

Among his fashion advertisement series are the recurring assignments for Gianni Versace, beginning with the spring/summer campaign 1980. He also photographed the Calvin Klein Jeans campaign featuring a fifteen-year-old Brooke Shields, as well as directing her in the accompanying television commercials. Avedon first worked with Shields in 1974 for a Colgate toothpaste ad. He shot her for Versace, 12 American Vogue covers and Revlon's Most Unforgettable Women campaign. 

In the February 9, 1981, issue of Newsweek, Avedon said that "Brooke is a lightning rod. She focuses the inarticulate rage people feel about the decline in contemporary morality and destruction of innocence in the world." On working with Avedon, Shields told Interview magazine in May 1992, "When Dick walks into the room, a lot of people are intimidated. But when he works, he's so acutely creative, so sensitive. And he doesn't like it if anyone else is around or speaking. There is a mutual vulnerability, and a moment of fusion when he clicks the shutter. You either get it or you don't".

In addition to his continuing fashion work, by the 1960s Avedon was making studio portraits of civil rights workers, politicians, and cultural dissidents of various stripes in an America fissured by discord and violence. He branched out into photographing patients of mental hospitals, the Civil Rights Movement in 1963, protesters of the Vietnam War, and later the fall of the Berlin Wall.   

A personal book called Nothing Personal with a text by his high school classmate James Baldwin, appeared in 1964.  It includes photographs documenting the civil rights movement, cultural figures and an extended collection of pictures of people in a mental asylum; together with Baldwin's searing text, it makes a striking commentary on America in 1964. 

During this period, Avedon also created two well known sets of portraits of The Beatles. The first, taken in mid to late 1967, consisted of five psychedelic portraits of the group — four heavily solarized individual color portraits, and a black-and-white group portrait taken with a Rolleiflex camera and a normal Planar lens. The next year, he photographed the much more restrained portraits that were included with The Beatles LP in 1968. Among the many other rock bands photographed by Avedon, in 1973, he shot Electric Light Orchestra with all the members exposing their bellybuttons for recording On the Third Day.

Avedon was always interested in how portraiture captures the personality and soul of its subject. As his reputation as a photographer became more well known, he photographed many public figures in his studio with a large-format 8×10 view camera. His subjects include Buster Keaton, Marian Anderson, Marilyn Monroe, Ezra Pound, Isak Dinesen, Dwight D. Eisenhower, Andy Warhol, and the Chicago Seven. 

By eliminating the use of soft lights and props, Avedon was able to focus on the inner worlds of his subjects evoking emotions and reactions. He would at times evoke reactions from his portrait subjects by guiding them into uncomfortable areas of discussion or asking them psychologically probing questions. Through these means he would produce images revealing aspects of his subject's character and personality that were not typically captured by others.

Avedon's mural groupings featured emblematic figures: Andy Warhol with the players and stars of The Factory; The Chicago Seven, political radicals charged with conspiracy to incite riot at the 1968 Democratic National Convention; the Beat poet Allen Ginsberg and his extended family; and the Mission Council, a group of military and government officials who governed the United States' participation in the Vietnam War.

In 1982, Avedon produced a playfully inventive series of advertisements for fashion label Christian Dior, based on the idea of film stills. Featuring director Andre Gregory, photographer Vincent Vallarino and model/actress Kelly Le Brock, the color photographs purported to show the wild antics of a fictional "Dior family" living ménage à trois while wearing elegant fashions.

Avedon became the first staff photographer for The New Yorker in 1992, where his post-apocalyptic, wild fashion fable “In Memory of the Late Mr. and Mrs. Comfort,” featuring model Nadja Auermann and a skeleton, was published in 1995. Other pictures for the magazine, ranging from the first publication, in 1994, of previously unpublished photos of Marilyn Monroe to a resonant rendering of Christopher Reeve in his wheelchair and nude photographs of Charlize Theron in 2004, were topics of wide discussion.

In the American West 

 
Serious heart inflammations hindered Avedon's health in 1974. The troubling time inspired him to create a compelling collection from a new perspective. In 1979, he was commissioned by Mitchell A. Wilder (1913–1979), the director of the Amon Carter Museum in Fort Worth, Texas, to complete the “Western Project.” 

Wilder envisioned the project to portray Avedon's take on the American West. It became a turning point in Avedon's career when he focused on everyday working class subjects such as miners soiled in their work clothes, housewives, farmers and drifters on larger-than-life prints, instead of the more traditional options of focusing upon public figures or the openness and grandeur of the West. The project lasted five years concluding with an exhibition and a catalogue. It allowed Avedon and his crew to photograph 762 people and expose approximately 17,000 sheets of 8×10 Kodak Tri-X Pan film. The collection identified a story within his subjects of their innermost self, a connection Avedon admits would not have happened if his new sense of mortality through severe heart conditions and aging hadn't occurred.  Avedon visited and traveled through state fair rodeos, carnivals, coal mines, oil fields, slaughter houses and prisons to find subjects. 

In 1994, Avedon revisited his subjects who would later speak about In the American West aftermath and its direct effects. Billy Mudd, a trucker, spent long periods of time on his own away from his family. He was a depressed, disconnected and lonely man before Avedon offered him the chance to be photographed. When he saw his portrait for the first time, Mudd saw that Avedon revealed something about him that allowed him to recognize the need for change in his life. The portrait transformed Mudd, and led him to quit his job and return to his family.

Helen Whitney's 1996 American Masters documentary episode, Avedon: Darkness and Light, depicts an aging Avedon identifying In the American West  as his best body of work.  

During the production period Avedon encountered problems with size availability for quality printing paper. While he experimented with platinum printing he eventually settled on Portriga Rapid, a double-weight, fiber-based gelatin silver paper manufactured by Agfa-Gevaert. Each print required meticulous work, with an average of thirty to forty manipulations. Two exhibition sets of In the American West were printed as artist proofs, one set to remain at the Carter after the exhibition there, and the other, property of the artist, to travel to the subsequent six venues.

While In the American West is one of the Avedon's most notable works, it has often been criticized for falsifying the West through voyeuristic themes and for exploiting his subjects. Critics question why a photographer from the East who traditionally focuses on models or public figures would go out West to capture the working class members who represent hardship and suffering. They argue that Avedon's intentions are to influence and evoke condescending emotions from the viewer such as pity.

Exhibitions 
Avedon had numerous museum exhibitions around the world. His first major retrospective was at the Minneapolis Institute of Arts in 1970. 

The Metropolitan Museum of Art (NYC) presented two solo exhibitions during his lifetime, in 1978 and 2002. In 1980, a retrospective was organized by the University Art Museum in Berkeley. Major retrospectives were mounted at the Whitney Museum of American Art, New York (1994), and at the Louisiana Museum of Modern Art, Humlebaek, Denmark (2007; which traveled to Milan, Paris, Berlin, Amsterdam and San Francisco, through 2009). Showing Avedon's work from his earliest, sun-splashed pictures in 1944 to portraits in 2000 that convey his fashion fatigue, the International Center of Photography in 2009 mounted the largest survey of his fashion work. Also in 2009, the Corcoran Gallery of Art showed Richard Avedon: Portraits of Power, bringing together his political portraits for the first time.

Collections 
Avedon's work is held in the following permanent collections:
The Art Institute of Chicago, Chicago, IL
Museum of Modern Art, New York 
Metropolitan Museum of Art, New York 
Smithsonian's National Museum of American History, Washington, D.C.
Amon Carter Museum of American Art, Ft. Worth, Texas 
Centre Georges Pompidou, Paris
Israel Museum, Jerusalem. Supported by Leonard A. Lauder and Larry Gagosian, the Avedon Foundation gave 74 Avedon images to the Israel Museum in 2013.
Center for Creative Photography, Tucson, Arizona

Awards 
1989: Lifetime Achievement Award from the Council of Fashion Designers of America
1989: Honorary graduate degree from the Royal College of Art
1991: Hasselblad Award - https://www.hasselbladfoundation.org/wp/richard-avedon-2/
1993: Honorary graduate degree from the Kenyon College
1993: International Center of Photography's Master of Photography Award
1994: Honorary graduate degree from the Parsons School of Design
1994: Prix Nadar in for his book Evidence (1994)
2001: Fellow of the American Academy of Arts and Sciences
2003: Kitty Carlisle Hart Award, Arts & Business Council, New York
2003: Royal Photographic Society 150th Anniversary Medal
2003: National Arts Award for Lifetime Achievement
2003: The Royal Photographic Society's Special 150th Anniversary Medal and Honorary Fellowship (HonFRPS)
2017: International Photography Hall of Fame, St.Louis

Art market 
In 2010, a record price of £719,000 was achieved at Christie's for a unique seven-foot-high print of model Dovima, posing in a Christian Dior evening dress with elephants from the Cirque d’Hiver, Paris, in 1955. This particular print, the largest of this image, was made in 1978 for Avedon's fashion retrospective at the Metropolitan Museum of Art in New York, and was bought by Maison Christian Dior.

Personal life 
In 1944, Avedon married 19-year-old bank teller Dorcas Marie Nowell, who later became the model and actress Doe Avedon; they did not have children and divorced in 1949. The couple summered at the gay village of Cherry Grove, Fire Island, and Avedon's bisexuality has been attested to by colleagues and family.  He was reportedly devastated when Nowell left him.

In 1951, he married Evelyn Franklin; she died on March 13, 2004. Their marriage produced one son, John Avedon, who has written extensively about Tibet.
In 1970, Avedon purchased a former carriage house on the Upper East Side of Manhattan that would serve as both his studio and apartment. In the late 1970s, he purchased a four-bedroom house on a  estate in Montauk, New York, between the Atlantic Ocean and a nature preserve; he sold it for almost $9 million in 2000.

According to Norma Stevens, Avedon's longtime studio director, Avedon confided in her about his homosexual relationships, including a decade-long affair with director Mike Nichols.

Death
On October 1, 2004, Avedon died in a San Antonio, Texas, hospital of complications from a cerebral hemorrhage. He was in San Antonio shooting an assignment for The New Yorker. At the time of his death, he was also working on a new project titled Democracy to focus on the run-up to the 2004 U.S. presidential election.

Legacy 
The Richard Avedon Foundation is a private operating foundation, structured by Avedon during his lifetime. It began its work shortly after his death in 2004. Based in New York, the foundation is the repository for Avedon's photographs, negatives, publications, papers, and archival materials. In 2006, Avedon's personal collection was shown at the Pace/MacGill Gallery, New York, and at the Fraenkel Gallery, San Francisco, and later sold to benefit the Avedon Foundation. The collection included photographs by Martin Munkacsi, Edward Steichen and Man Ray, among others. A slender volume, Eye of the Beholder: Photographs From the Collection of Richard Avedon (Fraenkel Gallery), assembles the majority of the collection in a boxed set of five booklets: “Diane Arbus,” “Peter Hujar”, “Irving Penn”, “The Countess de Castiglione” and “Etcetera,” which includes 19th- and 20th-century photographers.

In popular culture 
Hollywood presented a fictional account of Avedon's early career in the 1957 musical Funny Face, starring Fred Astaire as the fashion photographer "Dick Avery." Avedon supplied some of the still photographs used in the production, including its most noted single image: an intentionally overexposed close-up of Audrey Hepburn's face in which only her noted features – her eyes, her eyebrows, and her mouth – are visible.

Hepburn was Avedon's muse in the 1950s and 1960s, and he went so far as to say: "I am, and forever will be, devastated by the gift of Audrey Hepburn before my camera. I cannot lift her to greater heights. She is already there. I can only record. I cannot interpret her. There is no going further than who she is. She has achieved in herself her ultimate portrait."

The 2005 film Capote contains a recreation of Avedon photographing convicted murderers Perry Edward Smith and Richard Hickock in April 1960. Avedon is portrayed by the film's cinematographer, Adam Kimmel.

Noted photographs 
Marella Agnelli, Italian socialite, 1953
, Brazilian socialite (Vogue's 10 best dressed), 1970
Dovima with Elephants, 1955
Marilyn Monroe, actress, 1957
Homage to Munkacsi, Carmen, coat by Cardin, Paris, 1957
Brigitte Bardot, actress, 1959
Jacqueline de Ribes, 1961
John F Kennedy, 1960
Christina Bellin, model, 1962
Kareem Abdul-Jabbar (Lew Alcindor), athlete 1963
Dwight David Eisenhower, President of the United States, 1964
The Beatles, 1967
The Chicago Seven: Lee Weiner, John Froines, Abbie Hoffman, Rennie Davis, Jerry Rubin, Tom Hayden, Dave Dellinger, 1969
Andy Warhol and Members of the Factory, New York, 1969
Sly Stone (cover of the album Fresh), 1973
Asha Puthli, (She Loves to Hear the Music Album back cover), 1974
Muddy Waters, cover of Hard Again, 1977
Ronald Fischer, beekeeper, 1981
Nastassja Kinski and the Serpent, 1981
Pile of beautiful people, Versace campaign, 1982Whitney Houston (cover of Whitney), 1987Hikaru Utada (cover of Addicted to You),1999Tom Ford, 2002

 Books Observations. New York: Simon & Schuster, 1959. Photographs by Avedon, commentary by Truman Capote. Portraits of noted people.Nothing Personal. New York: Atheneum: 1964. A collaborative book with James Baldwin.Alice in Wonderland: The Forming of a Company and the Making of a Play. Merlin: 1973. By Avedon and Doon Arbus. .Portraits. Noonday: 1976. Introduction by Harold Rosenberg. .Portraits 1947–1977. Farrar, Straus and Giroux, 1978. .In the American West.In the American West, Photographs by Richard Avedon. New York: Abrams, 1985. With an introduction by Laura Wilson. Published in conjunction with an exhibition at Amon Carter Museum, Fort Worth, TX.In the American West, 1979–1984. New York: Abrams, 1985. .In the American West: 20th Anniversary Edition. New York: Abrams, 2005. .An Autobiography. 1993. Photographs arranged to tell Avedon's life story.Evidence. 1994. Essays and text about Avedon with photographs by Avedon.The Sixties. 1999. By Avedon and Doon Arbus. Photographs of noted people.Made in France, 2001. A retrospective of Avedon's fashion portraiture from the 1950s.Richard Avedon Portraits' 2002. Celebrities and subjects from In The American West. Published in conjunction with an exhibition at the Metropolitan Museum of Art.Woman in the Mirror. 2005. With an essay by Anne Hollander.Performance. 2008. With an essay by John Lahr.Portraits of Power.'' 2008. Edited by Paul Roth. With an essay by Renata Adler. Published in conjunction with an exhibition at the Corcoran Gallery of Art in Washington, D.C.

See also 
Michael Avedon

References

External links 

 Richard Avedon ca 1948.
  – official site
 Richard Avedon at Biography.com
 
 Richard Avedon: Portrait Series of Jacob Israel Avedon from the Collection of  The Jewish Museum (New York)

1923 births
2004 deaths
20th-century American photographers
21st-century American photographers
AIGA medalists
American people of Russian-Jewish descent
American portrait photographers
American sailors
Bisexual photographers
Bisexual men
American bisexual people
Jewish American artists
Columbia College (New York) alumni
Commercial photographers
DeWitt Clinton High School alumni
Fashion photographers
Bisexual Jews
Fellows of the American Academy of Arts and Sciences
American LGBT photographers
LGBT people from New York (state)
Photographers from New York City
20th-century American Jews
21st-century American Jews
20th-century American LGBT people